Paul Carter is a former English professional squash player.

Paul was born on 23 September 1963 in Kent and represented Hertfordshire at county level. He became National champion in 1988 and competed in the British Open Squash Championships throughout the nineties. He represented England at International level.

References

English male squash players
1963 births
Living people